Ramiro I  may refer to:
Ramiro I of Asturias (died 850)
Ramiro I of Aragon (died 1063)